Selenge Erdene-Ochir (born 30 December 1987, Erdenet, Mongolia) is a Mongolian fashion model and a former winner of Miss Mongolia-World. She was the first Mongolian ever to compete and work for the fashion channel "FTV". She won "First Runner Up" and "Ambassador of Mongolia" award at the "Miss Fashion TV" models contest. 

Selenge moved to United Kingdom in October, 2020 from Antalya, Turkey

Early life

Named after the Selenge River, she was born December 30, 1987, in Erdenet, Mongolia. She was the youngest daughter of Erdene-Ochir (father) and Khadbaatar (Mother). Her sister Baigal, named after Lake Baikal, was born in Irkutsk. Selenge's family moved to Ulaanbaatar when she 7, where she lived in the "Zhukovsky" area named after Georgy Zhukov. In 2005, she graduated from Russian high school "Iskra". She graduated from the university of "Tsakhim" Technology school in Program Engineering in 2010. She moved to Los Angeles, California with her boyfriend in 2011, and studied forensics. In 2013 she studied fashion design at the local university "Urlakh Erdem" in Ulaanbaatar.

Her modelling career began at age 9 when she joined a local modeling course. Her teacher, former model "Baigali", who's a namesake to Baigal, was introduced to her by her elder sister, who was also one of his students as well. She entered her first modeling contest at age 12 where she was nominated as "Potential" at local model contest called "Unsgeljin" (Cinderella) in 2002.

Career

Selenge Erdene-Ochir won beauty pageants and became Miss Mongolia- World in Ulaanbaatar, Mongolia 2006. She placed 4th at Miss Talent hosted in Wrocław, Poland 2006. She came 4th at the Miss Sports Nominee.

Selenge works as a fashion presenter. She won First Runner up as the  Ambassador of Mongolia at the Semi Final held in Ho Chi Minh City.  She also appeared at the Grand Final in Bangkok, Thailand.

She was the first model to represent her country at the "Miss Fashion TV" model contest. She worked for the company as a model and became a Project Coordinator. She also competed at the "Miss Bikini International" - models contest held in Shanghai, China. She was nominated for the "Miss Aura" award in 2007.

She appeared on magazine covers for "Gyalbaa", "Uptown", "TV-INFO", "Reader's Digest", "Yalguun", "Umbrella" in Mongolia. She played a small role in a comedic movie called Pomogite Nam-2 representing her title as "Beauty Queen".

She worked in overseas at Fashion TV, modeling for Diva Models, Singapore, Elite Models, Milan, Italy, IMG Models, in New York, and Red Models, Bangkok.

References

External links

Withloveselenge.com
Fashiontv.com

Living people
1987 births
Mongolian female models
People from Erdenet
Mongolian beauty pageant winners
Miss World 2006 delegates